The Akaflieg München Mü8 is a light sports aircraft that was designed and built in Germany in 1933.

Development 
The first powered aircraft to be built by Akaflieg München was the Mü8, an uncomplicated aircraft in design and construction, cheap to build and operate. Constructed from wood throughout the Mü8 was a single-seat open cockpit aircraft with a wire-braced low wing covered with fabric. Power came from a  DKW engine, initially but this was replaced by a  unit later with a commensurate reduction in performance, maximum level speed reducing from 130 km/h (81 mph) to 105 km/h (65 mph). The Akaflieg München Mü14 was an unbuilt development of the Mü8 powered by a 15 kW engine.

Variants 
 Akaflieg München Mü8 - The sole prototype of this low wing sport aircraft.
 Akaflieg München Mü14 - a proposed development of the Mü8.

Specifications (Mü8)

References

1930s German sport aircraft
Mu08
Single-engined tractor aircraft
Low-wing aircraft
Aircraft first flown in 1933